Emma Kalanikaumakaʻamano Kaleleonālani Naʻea Rooke (January 2, 1836 – April 25, 1885) was queen of Hawaii as the wife of King Kamehameha IV from 1856 to his death in 1863. She was later a candidate for the throne but King Kalākaua was elected instead.

Names 
After her son's death and before her husband's death, she was referred to as "Kaleleokalani", or "flight of the heavenly one". After her husband also died, it was changed into the plural form as "Kaleleonālani", or the "flight of the heavenly ones". She was baptized into the Anglican faith on October 21, 1862 as "Emma Alexandrina Francis Agnes Lowder Byde Rooke Young Kaleleokalani.

Queen Emma was also honoured in the 19th century mele "Wahine Holo Lio" (horseback riding lady) referring to her renowned horsemanship.

Early life 
Emma was born on January 2, 1836, in Honolulu and was often called Emalani ("royal Emma"). Her father was High Chief George Naʻea and her mother was High Chiefess Fanny Kekelaokalani Young. She was adopted under the Hawaiian tradition of hānai by her childless maternal aunt, chiefess Grace Kamaʻikuʻi Young Rooke, and her husband, Dr. Thomas C. B. Rooke.

Emma's father Naʻea was the son of High Chief Kamaunu and High Chiefess Kukaeleiki. Kukaeleiki was daughter of Kalauawa, a Kauaʻi noble, and she was a cousin of Queen Keōpūolani, the most sacred wife of Kamehameha I. Among Naʻea's more notable ancestors were Kalanawaʻa, a high chief of Oʻahu, and High Chiefess Kuaenaokalani, who held the sacred kapu rank of Kekapupoʻohoʻolewaikala (so sacred that she could not be exposed to the sun except at dawn).

On her mother's side, Emma was the granddaughter of John Young, Kamehameha I's British-born military advisor known as High Chief Olohana, and Princess Kaʻōanaʻeha Kuamoʻo. Her maternal grandmother, Kaʻōanaʻeha, was generally called the niece of Kamehameha I. Chiefess Kaʻōanaʻeha's father is disputed; some say she was the daughter of Prince Keliʻimaikaʻi, the only full brother of Kamehameha; others state Kaʻōanaʻeha's father was High Chief Kalaipaihala. This confusion is due to the fact that High Chiefess Kalikoʻokalani, the mother of Kaʻōanaʻeha, married both to Keliʻimaikaʻi and to Kalaipaihala. Through High Chief Kalaipaihala, she could be descended from Kalaniʻopuʻu, King of Hawaii before Kīwalaʻō and Kamehameha. King Kalākaua and Queen Liliʻuokalani criticized Queen Emma's claim of descent from Kamehameha's brother, supporting the latter theory of descent. Liliʻuokalani claimed that Keliʻimaikaʻi had no children, and that Kiilaweau, Keliʻimaikaʻi's first wife, was a man. This was to strengthen their claim to the throne, since their great-grandfather was Kamehameha I's first cousin.  But even through the second theory Queen Emma would still have been descendant of Kamehameha I's first cousin since Kalaniʻopuʻu was the uncle of Kamehameha I. It can be noted that one historian of the time, Samuel Kamakau, supported Queen Emma's descent from Keliʻimaikaʻi and the genealogy stated by Liliuokalani have been contested in her own lifetime.

Emma grew up in her adoptive parents' English mansion, the Rooke House, in Honolulu. Emma was educated at the Royal School, which was established by American missionaries. Other Hawaiian royals attending the school included Emma's half-sister Mary Paʻaʻāina. Like her classmates Bernice Pauahi Bishop, David Kalākaua and Lydia Liliʻuokalani, Emma was cross-cultural — both Hawaiian and Euro-American in her habits. When the school closed, Dr. Rooke hired an English governess, Sarah Rhodes von Pfister, to tutor the young Emma. He also encouraged reading from his extensive library. As a writer, he influenced Emma's interest in reading and books. By the time she was 20, she was an accomplished young woman. She was 5' 2" and slender, with large black eyes. Her musical talents as a vocalist, pianist and dancer were well known. She was also a skilled equestrian.

Married life and reign 

Emma became engaged to the king of Hawaii, Alexander Liholiho. At the engagement party, a Hawaiian charged that Emma's Caucasian blood made her unfit to be the Hawaiian queen and her lineage was not suitable enough to be Alexander Liholiho's bride. She broke into tears and the king was infuriated. On June 19, 1856, she married Alexander Liholiho, who a year earlier had assumed the throne as Kamehameha IV. He was also fluent in both Hawaiian and English. Each nation and even the Chinese hosted balls and celebrations in honor of the newlyweds. Two years later on May 20, 1858 Emma gave birth to a son, Prince Albert Edward Kamehameha.

The queen tended palace affairs, including the expansion of the palace library. In 1861 she sang in the chorus of a performance of Verdi's opera Il Trovatore in Honolulu while her husband the king acted as stage manager. She was known for her humanitarian efforts. Inspired by her adoptive father's work, she encouraged her husband to establish a public hospital to help the Native Hawaiians who were in decline due to foreign-borne diseases like smallpox. In 1859, Emma established Queen's Hospital and visited patients there almost daily whenever she was in residence in Honolulu. It is now called the Queen's Medical Center. She also founded St. Andrewʻs Priory school for girls. Queen Emma recognized the educational needs of the young women of Hawaiʻi and founded St. Andrew's Priory so that Hawaiian girls would receive an education equivalent to what was traditionally offered only to boys.

Prince Albert, who was always called "Baby" by Emma, had been celebrated for days at his birth and every public appearance. Mary Allen, wife of the Chief Justice of the Supreme Court Elisha Hunt Allen, had a son Frederick about the same age, and they became playmates. In 1862, Queen Victoria agreed to become godmother by proxy, and sent an elaborate silver christening cup. Before the cup could arrive, the prince fell ill in August and condition worsened. The Prince died on August 27, 1862. Her husband died a year later, and Emma would not have any more children.

Religious legacy 

In 1860, Queen Emma and King Kamehameha IV petitioned the Church of England to help establish the Church of Hawaii. Upon the arrival of Anglican bishop Thomas Nettleship Staley and two priests, they both were baptized on October 21, 1862 and confirmed in November 1862. With her husband, she championed the Anglican (Episcopal) church in Hawaii and founded St. Andrew's Cathedral, raising funds for the building. In 1867 she founded Saint Andrew's Priory School for Girls. She also laid the groundwork for an Episcopal secondary school for boys originally named for Saint Alban, and later ʻIolani School in honor of her husband. 

The Feast of the Holy Sovereigns is celebrated annually in the Episcopal Church in Hawaii on November 28, honoring Kamehameha IV and Emma. The rest of the Episcopal Church observes this as the feast day of Kamehameha and Emma, King and Queen of Hawaii, but does not use the name "Feast of the Holy Sovereigns".

Visit to Europe and United States, 1865–1866 

From 1865 to 1866, she traveled to England and the United States for her health and to help the burgeoning Anglican mission in Hawaii. She visited London and spent the winter at Hyères in the French Rivera and then toured Northern Italy and Southern Germany before visiting Paris. She returned to London in June 1866 and went sightseeing in Ireland before sailing for New York. In her time in Europe, she met with Queen Victoria, Emperor Napoleon III, Empress Eugénie of France, Grand Duke Frederick II and Grand Duchess Louise of Baden and other Europeans royals, government dignitaries and Anglican clergy.

In the United States, she had a reception given for her on August 14, 1866 by President Andrew Johnson and First Lady Eliza McCardle Johnson at the White House. Some note this as the first time anyone with the title "Queen" had had an official visit to the U.S. presidential residence. Secretary of State William H. Seward hosted the queen at his house and gave her state dinner on August 18. The following evening she attended a private dinner at the White House with the president, his family and Seward. While in Washington, she also met the Choctaw chief Peter Pitchlynn and his country's delegation, along with delegations of Chickasaw and Cherokee. This was the only instance of bilateral relations between the Hawaiian Kingdom and the three tribal republics. After visiting Washington, she visited Niagara Falls and Canada. The news of her hānai mother Grace's death in Hawaii on July 26 prompted her to end her trip and journey home. The United States government dispatched the USS Vanderbilt at San Francisco to bring her back to Honolulu.

A pamphlet Queen Emma: A Narrative of the Object of Her Mission to England describing her travel and mission in England was published anonymously in London in December 1865. American missionary Samuel C. Damon published this in his newspaper The Friend in June 1866 and pointed out some errors in the work.

Royal election of 1874 
After the death of King Lunalilo, Emma decided to run in the constitutionally-mandated royal election against future King Kalākaua. She claimed that Lunalilo had wanted her to succeed him, but died before a formal proclamation could be made.

The day after Lunalilo died, Kalākaua declared himself candidate for the throne. The next day Queen Emma did the same. The first real animosity between the Kamehamehas and Kalākaua begun to appear, as he published a proclamation:

Queen Emma issued her proclamation the next day:

Emma's candidacy was agreeable to many Native Hawaiians, not only because her husband was a member of the Kamehameha Dynasty, but she was also closer in descent to Hawaii's first king, Kamehameha The Great, than her opponent. On foreign policy, she (like her husband) was pro-British while Kalākaua, although being pro-Hawaiian and somewhat pro-British, was more leaning toward the American. She also strongly wished to stop Hawaii's dependence on American industry and to give the Native Hawaiians a more powerful voice in government. While the people supported Emma, the Legislative Assembly, which actually elected the new monarch, favored Kalākaua, who won the election 39 – 6. News of her defeat caused a large-scale riot in which thirteen legislators supporting Kalākaua were injured; one, J. W. Lonoaea, ultimately died of his injuries.
In order to quell the civil disruption, American and British troops stationed on warships in Honolulu Harbor were landed with the permission of the Hawaiian government, and the rioters were arrested.

After the election, she retired from public life. While she would come to recognize Kalākaua as the rightful king, she would never speak with his wife Queen Kapiʻolani.

She was known affectionately as the "Old Queen". King Kalākaua left a seat for her at any royal occasion, even though she rarely attended.

Friendship with Queen Victoria 

Despite the great differences in their kingdoms, Queen Emma and Queen Victoria became lifelong friends; both had lost sons and spouses. They exchanged letters, and Emma met Victoria for the first time on September 9, 1865 on her trip to England and later spent a night at Windsor Castle on November 27.

Queen Victoria recorded in her journal on the afternoon of September 9, 1865:
After luncheon I received Queen Emma, the widowed Queen of the Sandwich Islands or Hawaii. Met her in the Corridor & nothing could be nicer or more dignified than her manner. She is dark, but not more so than an Indian, with fine feathers [features?] & splendid soft eyes. She was dressed in just the same widow's weeds as I wear. I took her into the White Drawing room, where I asked to sit down next to me on the sofa. She was moved when I spoke to her of her great misfortune in losing her only child. She was very discreet & would only remain a few minutes. She presented her lady, Mrs. Hoopile whose husband is her Chaplain, both being Hawaiians....

Death and legacy 

In 1883, Emma suffered the first of several small strokes and died two years later on April 25, 1885 at the age of 49.

At first she was laid in state at her house; but Alexander Cartwright and a few of his friends moved the casket to Kawaiahaʻo Church, saying her house was not large enough for the funeral. This was evidently not popular with those in charge of the church, since it was Congregational; Queen Emma had been a supporter of the Anglican Mission, and was an Episcopalian. Queen Liliʻuokalani said it "...showed no regard for the sacredness of the place". However, for the funeral service, Bishop Alfred Willis of the English Church officiated in the Congregational church with his ritual. She was given a royal procession and was interred in the Royal Mausoleum of Hawaii known as Mauna ʻAla, next to her husband and son.

The Queen Emma Foundation was set up to provide continuous lease income for the hospital. Its landholding in the division known as the Queen Emma Land Company include the International Marketplace and Waikiki Town Center buildings. Some of the 40 year leases expire in 2010.
The area known as Fort Kamehameha in World War II, the site of several coastal artillery batteries, was the site of her former beach-front estate. After annexation it was acquired by the U.S. federal government in 1907.

The Emalani festival, Eo e Emalani i Alakaʻi held in October on the island of Kauaʻi in Koke'e State Park celebrates an 1871 visit.

Honours 
  Dame Grand Cross of the Most Noble Order of Kamehameha I (04/02/1879).

Family tree

See also 

 Hānaiakamalama (Queen Emma Summer Palace)
 The Queen's Medical Center

References

Bibliography

Further reading

External links 

 
 
 
 
 

 

1836 births
1885 deaths
Anglican saints
Royalty of the Hawaiian Kingdom
House of Kamehameha
House of Keliimaikai
Hawaiian royal consorts
Hawaiian Kingdom philanthropists
Hawaiian Kingdom people of Scottish descent
Converts to Anglicanism
Heirs to the Hawaiian throne
Burials at the Royal Mausoleum (Mauna ʻAla)
19th-century Christian saints
Hawaiian adoptees (hānai)
Christian female saints of the Late Modern era
Royal School (Hawaii) alumni
Hawaiian Kingdom Anglicans
19th-century philanthropists
History of women in Hawaii